The Trofeo Maserati is a single-marque motorsport championship that was started by Maserati Corse in 2003, with the introduction of the Maserati Coupé. Its title is commonly confused as Maserati Trofeo, which in fact refers to the name devised for the 4200 Coupé built for the series. However, in recent years Maserati themselves have been very inconsistent regarding the name of the championship, making it hard to define what is officially correct. In this article, the series will be referred to as Trofeo Maserati.

It is very similar to the Ferrari Challenge, although not on such a large scale. The concept is simple: customers purchase or rent a Trofeo car which is for track use only, register themselves and their team for a season or race and compete. Teams are not allowed to tune their engines, but can adjust suspension, brakes etc. Entrants can also use Maserati in-house teams at an additional cost.

Series

Originally, the Trofeo Maserati consisted of only one series, based in Europe. This was until 2010 when the Maserati Granturismo MC (not to be confused with the GranTurismo MC Stradale) was introduced. Today, there are several series. The Trofeo Maserati is regulated by the National Sporting Authority (ASN) of an involved country and FIA. If there is any argument during a race weekend, the ASN has a higher ruling than the FIA.

Trofeo Worldwide

This new season format was introduced in 2010 alongside the new GranTurismo MC. The 2012 calendar encompasses seven events spanning the globe, including circuits in Italy, China, Portugal, France, Spain, and the United States.  A new twist made in 2011 is the inauguration of "endurance" events. This gives the season a 3+3 format, with three regular race weekends and three endurance race weekends. The difference is explained below.

Trofeo European Series

This is a sub series to the Worldwide series which only encompasses the events in Europe, thus keeping the costs down for those who do not wish to bring the car to China and United States. This saves the entrants approximately €40,000 in entry fees alone, but they still compete in 5 of the 7 Worldwide series' events.

The regular events precede as follows:

 2 free practice sessions of 45 minutes each.
 2 qualifying sessions of 20 minutes each.
 2 races of 38 minutes + 1 lap each.

The endurance events precede as follows:

 2 free practice sessions of 45 minutes each.
 2 qualifying sessions of 20 minutes each.
 2 races of 28 minutes + 1 lap each.
 1 race of 48 minutes + 1 lap with one mandatory pit stop.

Trofeo Middle East

The JBF RAK Middle East championship is an unusual race series because it is run during the Northern Hemisphere's winter months. The season starts in November and ends in March. It is run on circuits in Abu Dhabi, Bahrain and Qatar. A season comprises seven events, just like the worldwide series. The Middle East series has yet to adapt the Worldwide Series' 3+3 season format. Technically, since the Worldwide Series ends in November and stars in April, those wishing to can race in the Trofeo-series all-year around. This is one of the only race series in the world which allow this unique possibility, and it is possibly the only GT Racing series.

Competitors

Upon joining the series, entrants can choose to participate in the Trofeo Racing Academy which is Maserati's own racing school. Furthermore Maserati Corse supply a season package called "fly & drive", this includes full hospitality and technical support at all the events over a season. The per-race cost for the old 4200 Trofeo was approximately $20,000.

Today, entrants can choose to compete in single or multi driver lineups. Those choosing to compete with two drivers effectively split the race weekend 50/50. With the first driver competing in the first race, and the second driver competing in the second race. In recent years this form of competing has become very popular in gentleman GT racing, because the drivers can split the costs.

Points and classes

At the end of each season, the following prizes and titles are awarded. This is universal for all the series.

 Trofeo Assoluto - For all drivers, this is the grand prize and champion title.
 Trofeo Maserati - Awarded to the driver with the most points, using an MC supported by Maserati.
 Trofeo Team - Awarded to the driver/team with the most points running their own car and team. (I.e. not rented or prepared by Maserati Corse)
 Trofeo over 50 - Awarded to the driver who is 50 years old or more with the most points.
 Trofeo under 30 - Awarded to the driver under 30 years old with the most points. This is to promote juniors competing in the series.
 Prize Pole Position - Awarded to the driver who has taken the highest number of pole positions throughout the season.

Points

Regular Race

 1st - 20
 2nd - 15
 3rd - 12
 4th - 10
 5th - 8
 6th - 6
 7th - 4
 8th - 3
 9th - 2
 10th - 1

Endurance Race

 1st - 25
 2nd - 18
 3rd - 15
 4th - 12
 5th - 10
 6th - 8
 7th - 6
 8th - 4
 9th - 2
 10th - 1

Cars

The Trofeo is and has always been single model championship, older models are not eligible for entry. The only model eligible is the one that Maserati is currently manufacturing and racing. This means that the Coupé-based Trofeo became ineligible to race at the arrival of the MC. Some of these were known as "Trofeo Lights" and primarily raced in FIA GT3. Maserati did for a short time produce Maserati 3200 GT Trofeo's, and were used for cup-style racing.

For each event Maserati supplies two spare cars. These may only be used by the drivers if there is a major technical failure or irreparable damage due to an accident.

GranTurismo MC
First released in 2010, all new MC's are delivered race prepared by Maserati technicians. Entrants who use private teams must have their cars homologated to meet the equal settings of the in-house raced MC's. It features aerodynamic enhancements and weight reduction over the GranTurismo S which it was originally based upon. It has a base price of €155-158.000 excl. VAT, but includes technical support throughout the initial season. The MC can also be run in all GT4 class racing series. It has around 488 bhp and gearchanges are dealt with in 60 ms. For 2012 the MC has a revised aero package encompassing amongst other minor changes a large rear wing.

See also
Ferrari Challenge
Porsche Supercup
Lamborghini Super Trofeo

References

External links
 
 

Maserati in motorsport
One-make series
Sports car racing series